Claes Kasper Bang (born 28 April 1967) is a Danish actor and musician. He is best known for playing the leading role of Christian in Ruben Östlund's 2017 film The Square, which won the Palme d'Or at the Cannes Film Festival, and for the role of Fjölnir in Robert Eggers's 2022 film The Northman. In 2019, he played the role of Sasha Mann for the final season of The Affair, and he rose to further international recognition by starring as Count Dracula in the BBC/Netflix series Dracula (2020). For his role in The Square, he became the first Dane to win the European Film Award for Best Actor. Bang has also developed a music career under the moniker of This Is Not America.

Early life
Bang was born in Odense on the Danish island of Funen. After his parents’ divorce, he mostly lived with his father and moved home frequently; he ended up attending several different schools while growing up. During his third year of high school, Bang participated in the musical Hair which sparked his interest in acting, and after he left school, he continued to do amateur theatre. At the age of 23, he made an application to the Danish National School of Theatre after discovering that the age limit for applying is 25. He was unsuccessful but applied again the next year and was accepted five days before his 25th birthday. He attended the school in 1992 and graduated with a diploma in 1996. His first theatre role after graduation was at Børneteatret Skægspire in the play Tudseakvariet, and he received his first breakthrough role in the Danish 1997 television show Taxa. He has worked mainly on stage and television in Denmark.

Acting career
From 2001 to 2004, he was a permanent member of the cast at Aalborg Teater. In 2002, he asked the theatre director for permission to perform a monologue called Ondskaben, which is based on Jan Guillou’s novel Evil. After leaving the theatre in 2004, Bang bought the rights to the work so he could perform the monologue at other theatres. He has performed the monologue almost 400 times, including an English language version in Denmark, Sweden, the UK, Germany, and South Africa.

Bang starred in numerous Danish television series and films early in his career. From 2006 to 2008, he gained wide recognition (particularly in Germany) for his role in the Danish police drama Anna Pihl. He subsequently starred in several German language roles both on television (Küstenwache, SOKO Wismar, Notruf Hafenkante, Sibel & Max, and Cologne P.D.) and in film (Jungle Child, Rettet Raffi!, Alle unter einer Tanne, and Überleben an der Scheidungsfront).

He played the leading role of the art museum curator Christian in Ruben Östlund's 2017 film The Square, which won the Palme d'Or at the 2017 Cannes Film Festival. He also won the European Film Award for Best Actor, being the first Dane to do so.

In November 2018, Bang was cast to play Count Dracula in the BBC mini-series Dracula, created by the film-makers involved in Sherlock. In an interview for The Guardian, it was observed that, while "sexy" and "insatiable", it is also "a very witty performance" from Bang.

On 14 April 2020, it was announced that Bang would be working on the pilot of Little Room (previously called The Agoraphobics Detective Society), which was produced by Maggie Montieth and directed/written by his Dracula co-star Dolly Wells, with Suzi Ewing and Heidi Greensmith. Bang and the other cast members filmed themselves from home on Zoom, and were responsible for the props, wardrobe, hair and makeup, and sound. The pilot was released online by Pinpoint Presents on 27 May 2020, and viewers were asked to donate to The Film and Television Charity and the Motion Picture & Television Fund, to help those in the film, TV and cinema industries who have been financially impacted by the COVID-19 pandemic.

Music career 
This Is Not America is the name of Bang's musical side project. He describes it as "a sanctuary and a creative playground where there is no director making the decisions." Bang writes and composes the songs himself, and his musical style can be described as a mix of Gangway, Pet Shop Boys and Depeche Mode. Music videos and album art for This Is Not America are produced with help from his wife Lis Kasper Bang, née Louis-Jensen, who does the filming and photography.

Bang started composing music for fun with a recording studio on his computer in 2002. He records the piano and guitar pieces himself (he learnt these instruments when he was younger) and then programs them with other sounds on his computer. Bang chose the alias This Is Not America to circumvent DR's policy of not broadcasting tracks by actors, and to prevent his acting career from influencing how people perceive his music. The name comes from a song by David Bowie, who is one of Bang's great role models. His first three singles "Don't Come Crying", "Shameless", and "Run" were played on P3 for a year before the station found out that they were made by the actor, however his songs were still played on various DR radio stations for a few more years. These singles were later released on the debut album Dislocated on 7 April 2010.

Two of Bang's co-stars have featured on some This Is Not America tracks. In 2015, he released the single "Still of the Night", featuring Charlotte Munck, his co-star in the Danish police drama Anna Pihl. While filming The Square, Bang discovered that co-star and musician Marina Schiptjenko shared the same taste in music, so he showed her some of his music and sent her a few demos. Once filming finished, they recorded five songs together in his home studio in Copenhagen. So far, the duo has released "Who Am I", "I Don't Care" and "Here We Go".

Personal life
Bang met stylist and photographer Liz Louis-Jensen in 2006 while they were both working on the play Den grønne elevator at Kanonhalløj. Louis-Jensen proposed to Bang on New Year's Eve 2007, and they got married on 25 September 2010 on a canal boat in Copenhagen. Bang is stepfather to Liz's two children, Sarah and Bella. The pair have lived together in Frederiksberg, Copenhagen since 2008.

Filmography

Film

Television

Podcasts

Theatre credits

Discography

Albums 

 2010: Dislocated

EPs 

2011: EP1
2014: Keep on Dancin’2015: Still of the Night2020: Here We Go2020: Butterflies in December2020: You & I (Forever Live or Die)2020: No Song Left Unsung2020: Your Love Is Wasted on Me2020: Take It on the Chin2021: Late to the Party Singles 
{| class="wikitable"
!Year
!Title
!Album/EP
|-
|2008
|"Don't Come Crying"
|DislocatedFeatured on the soundtrack for Take the Trash|-
| rowspan="2" |2009
|"Shameless"
| rowspan="2" |Dislocated|-
|"Run"
|-
|2011
|"Virgin Mary"
|EP1|-
| rowspan="2" |2012
|"Imaginary Friend"
|Re-released on Butterflies in December in 2020
|-
|"Jealousy"
|N/A
|-
| rowspan="2" |2014
|"No One"
| rowspan="2" |Keep on Dancin'Re-released on No Song Left Unsung in 2020
|-
|"Care"
|-
| rowspan="4" |2015
|"1983"
|Still of the NightRe-released on Butterflies in December in 2020
|-
|"Still of the Night (feat. Charlotte Munck)"
|Still of the Night|-
|"I'm Not Ready Yet"
|Still of the NightRe-released on No Song Left Unsung in 2020
|-
|"Will Santa Be There for Christmas?"
|N/A
|-
| rowspan="3" |2018
|"They Say It's Wrong"
|Re-released on No Song Left Unsung in 2020
|-
|"Who Am I (feat. Marina)"
|N/A
|-
|"I Don't Care (feat. Marina)"
|N/A
|-
| rowspan="11" |2020
|"All Said and Done"
|N/A
|-
|"Here We Go (feat. Marina)"
| rowspan="2" |Here We Go|-
|"Don't Come Crying (2020 edit)"
|-
|"Butterflies in December"
|Butterflies in December|-
|"You & I (Forever Live or Die)"
| rowspan="2" |You & I (Forever Live or Die)|-
|"You & I (Forever Live or Die) - Gregers Remix"
|-
|"If Love Is the New Black"
|N/A
|-
|"Your Love Is Wasted on Me (feat. Marina)"
| rowspan="2" |Your Love Is Wasted on Me|-
|"Lullaby"
|-
|"Take It on the Chin"
| rowspan="2" |Take It on the Chin|-
|"Will Santa Be Here for Christmas?"
|-
| rowspan="3" |2021
|"Last Dance"
|N/A
|-
|"Just for a While"
|Late to the Party|-
|"A Saturday Afternoon at the End of the World"
|N/A
|}

 Music videos 

 2009: "Run"
 2014: "No One"
 2015: "I'm Not Ready Yet"
 2018: "Who Am I (feat. Marina)"

 Other 
Bang has also performed a number of songs as himself:

 2007: Claes Bang - "Når En Sailor Går I Land" (Otto Brandenburg cover)
 2014: Nogen Andre - "September" (feat. Claes Bang)
 2014: Martin Valsted - "Bilist" (feat. Claes Bang)
 2017: Claes Bang - "Party at the Castle" (The Square Original Motion Picture Soundtrack)
 2019: Jacob Gurevitsch - "Motivo Loco" (Bang featured in the music video)

 Bibliography 

 Audiobooks 

 Afterwords 

 2020: Dracula'' by Bram Stoker, translated to Danish by Benny Andersen, published by Gyldendal

Awards and nominations

References

External links
 
 Claes Bang at the Danish Film Database
Claes Bang at the British Film Institute

This Is Not America on Spotify

1967 births
Living people
People from Odense
20th-century Danish male actors
21st-century Danish male actors
Danish male film actors
Danish male stage actors
Danish male television actors
Danish theatre people
European Film Award for Best Actor winners